The tribe Epidendreae of the Orchidaceae comprises six subtribes:
 Bletiinae sensu MMIV, which contains only the genera Basiphyllaea, Bletia, and Hexalectris
 Chysinae 
 Coeliinae
 Laeliinae
 Pleurothallidinae
 Ponerinae

References 

 
Epidendroideae tribes